Bijan Beg (Bezhan, Bizhan; fl. 17th-century) was a Safavid official and gholam of Georgian origin. He served as a governor (beglarbeg) of Azerbaijan during the reign of king Suleiman I (r. 1666–1694).

Biography
A scion of the Saakadze family, Bijan was the son of the former sepahsalar (commander-in-chief), Rostam Khan (c. 1588 – 1 March 1643), and an uncle of the later sepahsalar and divanbegi (chancellor, chief justice), also named Rostam Khan. He was a namesake to his grandfather. His brother Safiqoli (d. 1679) held influential positions in the Safavid ranks as well. 

Though Bijan's family had always been amongst the king's favorites according to the Italian traveller Gemelli Careri, Bijan himself had "fallen into disgrace" during the tenure of the grand vizier Shaykh Ali Khan Zanganeh (1669–1689). Shaykh Ali Khan had made him "suspect" with king Suleiman I, by claiming that he was a "madman" and a "drunkard". Careri adds that it was only through the mediation of his powerful nephew Rostam Khan, that the king could finally be convinced of his sanity.

References

Sources
 
 

17th-century deaths
Shia Muslims from Georgia (country)
Iranian people of Georgian descent
Safavid governors of Azerbaijan
Safavid ghilman
17th-century people of Safavid Iran
Safavid slaves